Pastrogor (or Patrogor) is a village in the municipality of Svilengrad, in Haskovo Province, in southern Bulgaria.

Pastrogor Peak in Antarctica is named after the village.

References

Villages in Haskovo Province